Distant Thunder is a studio album by British reggae band Aswad, released in 1988 through Mango Records. Recording sessions took place at the Fallout Shelter, The Point, Eastcote, Strongroom, Sarm West & East, Rooster, and RAK Studios in London. Production was handled entirely by Aswad, except two tracks produced with Chris Porter and Ron Fair.

Track listing

Personnel 

Aswad
 Brinsley "Dan" Forde – lead vocals, rhythm and lead guitar
 Dennis Anthony "Tony Gad" Robinson – lead vocals (track 8), vocals, bass guitar, Roland bass & keyboard
 Angus "Drummie Zeb" Gaye – lead vocals, drums, mixing
with:
 Eddie "Tan Tan" Thornton – trumpet
 Michael "Bami" Rose – saxophone
 Henry "Buttons" Tenyue – trombone
 Alan "Burt" Williams – saxophone
 Stanley "Soon Come" Andrew – lead guitar
 Michael "Cool Walk" Martin – keyboards
 Dee Lewis – backing vocals
 Carroll Edwina Thompson – backing vocals
 Caron Melina Wheeler – backing vocals
 Chyna Gordon – backing vocals
Technical
 Lee Hamblin – engineering
 Nick Sykes – engineering
 Jonny Milton – engineering
 Philip Bagenal – engineering
 Ron Fair – engineering, producer (track 6)
 Peter Gleadall – programming
 Duncan Bridgeman – programming
 Christopher John Ames Porter – producer (track 2)
 Les Spaine – management
 Lawrence Watson – photography

Charts

References

External links 
 

1988 albums
Aswad (band) albums
Island Records albums
Albums produced by Ron Fair
Reggae albums by British artists